In Greek mythology, Calypso (Ancient Greek: Καλυψώ Kalypso means 'she who conceals' or 'like the hidden tide') is the name of several nymphs, the most well known being:

 Calypso, the nymph who, in Homer's Odyssey, kept Odysseus with her on her island of Ogygia for seven years.

Other references to nymphs named Calypso, include:

 Calypso, one of the Oceanids, the 3,000 water nymph daughters of the Titans Oceanus and his sister-wife Tethys. She was, along with several of her sisters, one of the companions of Persephone when the maiden was abducted by Hades, the god of the Underworld. Her name may signify 'the sheltering cave'.
 Calypso, one of the 50 Nereids, sea-nymph daughters of the 'Old Man of the Sea' Nereus and the Oceanid Doris.
Calypso, one of the seven Hesperides and sister of Aiopis, Antheia, Donakis, Mermesa, Nelisa and Tara.

Notes

References 
 Apollodorus, The Library with an English Translation by Sir James George Frazer, F.B.A., F.R.S. in 2 Volumes, Cambridge, MA, Harvard University Press; London, William Heinemann Ltd. 1921. ISBN 0-674-99135-4. Online version at the Perseus Digital Library. Greek text available from the same website.
 Fowler, R. L., Early Greek Mythography: Volume 2: Commentary, Oxford University Press, 2013. .
 Grimal, Pierre, The Dictionary of Classical Mythology, Wiley-Blackwell, 1996. .
 Hesiod, Theogony, in The Homeric Hymns and Homerica with an English Translation by Hugh G. Evelyn-White, Cambridge, Massachusetts., Harvard University Press; London, William Heinemann Ltd. 1914. Online version at the Perseus Digital Library.
 Homer, The Odyssey with an English Translation by A.T. Murray, Ph.D. in two volumes. Cambridge, MA., Harvard University Press; London, William Heinemann, Ltd. 1919. . Online version at the Perseus Digital Library. Greek text available from the same website.
The Homeric Hymns and Homerica with an English Translation by Hugh G. Evelyn-White. Homeric Hymns. Cambridge, MA.,Harvard University Press; London, William Heinemann Ltd. 1914. Online version at the Perseus Digital Library. Greek text available from the same website.
 Kerényi, Carl, The Gods of the Greeks, Thames and Hudson, London, 1951.
Larson, Jennifer, "Greek Nymphs : Myth, Cult, Lore", Oxford University Press (US). June 2001. .
 Walters, Henry Beauchamp, History of Ancient Pottery, Greek, Etruscan, and Roman, Based on the Work of Samuel Birch, Volume 2, London, J. Murray, 1905.

Oceanids
Nereids
Children of Atlas
Hesperides
Calypso (mythology)